Mário Lucunde (13 May 1957 – 26 February 2023) was an Angolan Roman Catholic prelate.

Lucunde was born in Angola and was ordained to the priesthood in 1985. He served as bishop of the Roman Catholic Diocese of Menongue, Angola, from 2005 until his resignation in 2018.

References

1957 births
2023 deaths
21st-century Roman Catholic bishops in Angola
Bishops appointed by Pope Benedict XVI
People from Cuando Cubango Province